Lesbian, gay, bisexual, and transgender (LGBT) people in Kansas may face some legal challenges not experienced by non-LGBT residents. Same-sex sexual activity is legal in Kansas, and the state has prohibited discrimination on the basis of sexual orientation and gender identity in employment, housing and public accommodations since 2020.

Two lawsuits, one in state court and the other in federal court, challenged the constitutionality of the state's ban on same-sex marriage, and on November 4, 2014, a U.S. District Court judge ruled Kansas' ban on same-sex marriage unconstitutional. His ruling was stayed as the state sought a stay pending appeal without success, and it took effect on November 12, 2014. From November 12, 2014 to the Supreme Court's ruling in Obergefell v. Hodges on June 26, 2015, marriage licenses were generally available to same-sex couples, but the state government continued to deny recognition to same-sex marriages in all other respects.

History and legality of same-sex sexual activity
Prior to European settlement of Kansas, there were no known social or legal punishments for engaging in homosexual activity. Among several Native American tribes, customs of "two-spirit" individuals existed: people who would dress, act and live as the opposite gender, as well as perform tasks associated with the opposite gender. Such individuals are known as míⁿxoge in the  Kansa language, spoken by the Kaw people. The Native Americans did not share the typical Western views of gender and sexuality.

In 1855, sodomy ("crime against nature") was made a felony with a penalty of "not less than ten years". In 1859, this was changed to "not more than 10 years". In the 1925 case of State v. Hulbert, the Kansas Supreme Court held that fellatio, whether heterosexual or homosexual, violated the state's sodomy statute. A comprehensive reform of the law in 1969 resulted in a penalty of six months in jail and/or a fine of 1,000 dollars. The revision also legalized heterosexual sodomy; Kansas was one of the first U.S. states to do so. In 1976, a proposed bill to repeal the now-only homosexual sodomy law was approved by the Kansas House of Representatives by a vote of 21 to 19. However, it failed to be considered in the Senate.

In 1989, in State v. Moppin, the state Supreme Court held that cunnilingus did not violate the state sodomy statute. The Kansas Legislature acted quickly, passing a law the following year forbidding the "oral-genital stimulation between the tongue of a male and the genital area of a female." This law excluded lesbian relations but reintroduced criminal penalties for certain heterosexual conduct. In 1992, the law was amended to include lesbian relations as well.

Sterilization against "habitual criminals", including those convicted under the sodomy law, has a long history in the state of Kansas. In 1913, the Kansas Legislature passed a law allowing the sterilization of state inmates. This law was unanimously upheld by the state Supreme Court in 1928. By the end of 1934, 1,362 people had been sterilized under the law; 19% via the procedures of castration or oophorectomy, which the state defended as "limit[ing] lewdness and vice". Through 1948, the number of sterilizations had reached about 3,000, the third-highest in the entire United States, a majority on the ground of "insanity and mental retardation". The law was finally repealed in 1965.

The U.S. Supreme Court's 2003 decision in Lawrence v. Texas rendered laws banning consensual sexual activity unenforceable, including that of Kansas. State v. Limon, the first case decided under the Lawrence precedent, invalidated a provision of the state's Romeo and Juliet law that assigned harsher sentences in statutory rape cases where the parties were of the same sex.

Recognition of same-sex relationships

Marriage

Same-sex marriage became legal in Kansas following the U.S. Supreme Court decision in Obergefell v. Hodges on June 26, 2015, which found the denial of marriage rights to same-sex couples unconstitutional. By June 29, the next business day after the decision, 25 of the state's 32 judicial districts were issuing licenses to same-sex couples, and some of those that were not had yet to receive an application from a same-sex couple. By June 30, all judicial districts were either issuing same-sex marriage licenses or had announced their intention to do so. Kansas for the previous decade had recognized neither same-sex marriages nor any other form of legal recognition of same-sex unions. The state explicitly banned same-sex marriage and all other types of same-sex unions both by statute and by constitutional amendment.

The state's definitions and restrictions had been challenged in several lawsuits. On October 7, 2014, officials in Johnson County began accepting licenses for marriage applications, due to the Supreme Court's recent refusal to hear a Utah case now binding on Kansas. The state Attorney General filed a lawsuit in order to stop those actions. One couple obtained a marriage license and married on October 10, on the steps of the Johnson County courthouse. On October 10, 2014, the Kansas Supreme Court ordered officials in Johnson County to stop issuing marriage licenses to same-sex couples, though it allowed for court clerks to accept applications for marriage licenses from same-sex couples. It scheduled a hearing for November 6.

On November 18, 2014, the Kansas Supreme Court ruled that Johnson County had been within its jurisdiction to issue marriage licenses to same-sex couples based on its interpretation of the law. It lifted the stay on Johnson County from issuing the licenses, but did not direct other counties to issue them.

Judge Daniel D. Crabtree heard oral arguments on October 31, 2014 in another lawsuit in U.S. district court, Marie v. Moser. He found the state's ban on same-sex marriage unconstitutional on November 4, but stayed enforcement of his ruling for a week. The state sought a stay pending appeal without success from the Tenth Circuit Court of Appeals, and Crabtree's order preventing the state from enforcing its ban on same-sex marriage took effect on November 12 when the U.S. Supreme Court declined his request for a stay pending appeal.

Domestic partnership
The cities of Lawrence and Topeka have established domestic partnership registries.

Adoption and parenting
In November 2012, the Kansas Court of Appeals ruled in the case of In the Matter of the Adoption of I. M. that a single person who is not a biological parent of a child cannot petition to adopt that child without terminating the other parent's parental rights. However, the Kansas Supreme Court ruled on February 22, 2013, in Frazier v. Goudschaal, that the partner of a biological parent may receive parental rights according to the best interest of the children in some circumstances, such as where there is no second parent and thus no termination of parental rights is involved, and the partner has assumed a parenting role of the children.

Since the legalization of same-sex marriage, married same-sex couples have been allowed to adopt. Lesbian couples can access in vitro fertilization, and state law recognizes the non-genetic, non-gestational mother as a legal parent to a child born via donor insemination, but only if the parents are married. In addition, Kansas permits and recognizes both gestational and traditional surrogacy contracts, though the latter may result in more legal complications than the former. The state treats same-sex and different-sex couples equally under the same terms and conditions.

Kansas law allows adoption agencies to choose not to place children in certain homes if it would violate the agency's religious or moral convictions.

Discrimination protections

Between 2007 and 2015, Kansas prohibited discrimination on the basis of sexual orientation or gender identity in government employment due to an executive order issued by Governor Kathleen Sebelius in August 2007. Governor Sam Brownback rescinded that order on February 10, 2015. In January 2019, Governor Laura Kelly, shortly after taking office, signed an executive order to protect state government employees and contractors from discrimination based on their sexual orientation or gender identity.

The cities of Fairway, Kansas City, Lawrence, Leawood, Lenexa, Manhattan, Merriam, Mission, Mission Hills, Mission Woods, Olathe, Overland Park, Prairie Village, Roeland Park, Shawnee, Westwood and Westwood Hills, as well as Wyandotte County, prohibit discrimination on the basis of sexual orientation or gender identity in public and private employment, housing and public accommodations.

Other cities, including the capital city of Topeka, Emporia and Hutchinson, prohibit discrimination against city employees on account of their sexual orientation and gender identity. Likewise, the county of Shawnee, and the city of Wichita prohibit discrimination against city/county employees but on the basis of sexual orientation only.

On November 6, 2012, the voters of the cities of Salina and Hutchinson both voted to repeal city anti-discrimination ordinances on the basis of sexual orientation and gender identity.

In January 2014, Kansas House Bill 2453 was introduced which would have allowed people motivated by religious opposition to same-sex relationships to refuse to provide services to same-sex couples. On February 12, the Kansas House of Representatives passed the legislation by a 72–49 vote. The Kansas Senate did not take up the legislation. It was part of a broader movement to anticipate resistance to the recognition of same-sex marriages.

Since 2016, Kansas law has prohibited public universities from "[denying] a religious student association any benefit available to any other student association based on those organizations' sincerely held religious beliefs".

Bostock v. Clayton County

On June 15, 2020, the U.S. Supreme Court ruled in Bostock v. Clayton County, consolidated with Altitude Express, Inc. v. Zarda, and R.G. & G.R. Harris Funeral Homes Inc. v. Equal Employment Opportunity Commission that discrimination in the workplace on the basis of sexual orientation or gender identity is discrimination on the basis of sex, and Title VII therefore protects LGBT employees from discrimination.

In August 2020, the Kansas Human Rights Commission announced in light of Bostock that it will also investigate and resolve cases alleging discrimination in housing and public accommodations, such as retail stores and educational institutions. Any business with four or more employees will be covered; whereas the Supreme Court ruling only affects businesses with at least 15 employees.

Hate crime law
At present, Kansas' hate crime law provides penalty enhancements for the commission of a crime motivated by the victim's sexual orientation. It does not cover gender identity. However, federal law has covered both categories since the Matthew Shepard and James Byrd Jr. Hate Crimes Prevention Act was signed into law by President Barack Obama in October 2009.

Conversion therapy

In June 2020, Roeland Park became the first city in the state to ban conversion therapy on minors. Lawrence followed suit in April 2021.

In October 2021, Prairie Village became the third city within Kansas to legally ban conversion therapy.

Transgender rights

Kansas allows transgender people to change the sex marker on their birth certificate, driver's license and other personal documents. When Kansas began allowing this, only two states remained that did not: Ohio and Tennessee.

In October 2018, Lambda Legal filed a suit in court arguing that the policy of denying transgender people an updated birth certificate reflecting their gender identity is unconstitutional. The move followed judicial decisions striking down similar bans in Idaho and Puerto Rico earlier that year.

In June 2019, Kansas became the 48th U.S. state to allow transgender individuals to change their gender on official documents. The Office of Vital Statistics will issue an updated birth certificate upon receipt of an affidavit signed by the applicant requesting a change in sex designation, a completed "Application to Amend a Kansas Birth Certificate" form, and one of the following: an already updated driver's license, an already updated passport, or certification from a healthcare professional or mental health professional confirming "based on his or her professional opinion the true gender identity of the applicant and that it is expected that this will continue to be the gender with which the applicant will identify in the future". The Department of Revenue will issue an updated driver's license or state ID after the submission of either a court order, an already updated birth certificate, or medical attestation including a letter signed by the applicant requesting the change and a letter from a licensed physician stating that the "applicant has undergone appropriate clinical treatment or that the physician has re-evaluated the applicant and determined that gender reclassification based on physical criteria is appropriate".

The Kansas State High School Activities Association states that schools may decide on a case-by-case basis the appropriate athletic gender team for a transgender student. In both April 2021 and April 2022, the Kansas Legislature passed bills (twice over) that ban transgender athletes from participating in any female sports team, but Governor Laura Kelly vetoed both bills.

In 2022, a middle school math teacher in Geary County, Kansas sued the superintendent, complaining that the school requires her to use each student's preferred name. A federal judge granted part of a preliminary injunction in favor of the teacher while her case proceeded, allowing her to out the students to their parents.

On February 22, 2023, the Kansas House voted 82–40 to ban transgender girls from girls' sports, while the Kansas Senate voted 26–11 to ban doctors from providing gender-affirming care to minors and voted 26–10 to bar transgender people of any age from gendered public accommodations like bathrooms, requiring them to use the space associated with their gender assigned at birth. These were not veto-proof majorities: the House bill was two votes short, and the two Senate bills were each one vote short. Thus, Democratic Governor Laura Kelly is likely to veto them.

Public opinion
A 2017 Public Religion Research Institute (PRRI) opinion poll found that 57% of Kansas residents supported same-sex marriage, while 37% opposed it and 6% were unsure. Additionally, 67% supported an anti-discrimination law covering sexual orientation and gender identity. 26% were opposed.

Summary

References

LGBT rights in Kansas